The 2018–19 Liga Femenina de Baloncesto, also known as Liga Dia for sponsorship reasons, is the 56th season of the Spanish basketball women's league. Regular season will start on 13 October 2018 with the first matchday of the regular season and it will end on 7 April 2019 with the 26th matchday. The playoffs (quarter-finals, semi-finals and final)  will be held between 10 April and 5/9 May 2019.

The 2019 Spanish Cup will return to the Final Eight format, not used since 2009. It will be played between 28 February and 3 March 2019, featuring the top seven teams of the league after the 13th matchday on December 30, which will join the host.

Teams

Promotion and relegation (pre-season)
A total of 14 teams contest the league, including 12 sides from the 2017–18 season and two promoted from the 2017–18 Liga Femenina 2.

Teams promoted from Liga Femenina 2
Durán Maquinaria Ensino
Valencia Basket

Venues and locations
Source:

Regular season

League table

Positions by round
The table lists the positions of teams after completion of each round. In order to preserve chronological evolvements, any postponed matches are not included in the round at which they were originally scheduled, but added to the full round they were played immediately afterwards. For example, if a match is scheduled for round 13, but then postponed and played between rounds 16 and 17, it will be added to the standings for round 16.

Playoffs

Source: FEB

Quarterfinals

(1) Perfumerías Avenida vs. (8) Mann-Filter Casablanca

(2) Spar CityLift Girona vs. (7) RPK Araski

(3) Cadí La Seu vs. (6) IDK Gipuzkoa

(4) Lointek Gernika Bizkaia vs. (5) Valencia Basket

Semifinals

(1) Perfumerías Avenida vs. (5) Valencia Basket

(2) Spar CityLift Girona vs. (3) Cadí La Seu

Final

(1) Perfumerías Avenida vs. (2) Spar CityLift Girona

Stats leaders in regular season

Points

Rebounds

Assists

Performance Index Rating

Spanish clubs in European competitions

References and notes

External links
 Official website 

Spain
Fem
Liga Femenina de Baloncesto seasons
Liga